Horacio Zeballos was the defending champion, but lost in the second round to Daniel Gimeno Traver.
Fabio Fognini won the title, defeating Leonardo Mayer in the final 6–2, 6–4.

Seeds
The top four seeds receive a bye into the second round.

Draw

Finals

Top half

Bottom half
{{16TeamBracket-Compact-Tennis3-Byes
|RD1=First round
|RD2=Second round
|RD3=Quarterfinals
|RD4=Semifinals

|RD1-seed01=7
|RD1-team01= G García López
|RD1-score01-1=3
|RD1-score01-2=6
|RD1-score01-3=6
|RD1-seed02= 
|RD1-team02= J Reister
|RD1-score02-1=6
|RD1-score02-2=4
|RD1-score02-3=4

|RD1-seed03= 
|RD1-team03= P Lorenzi
|RD1-score03-1=6
|RD1-score03-2=6
|RD1-score03-3= 
|RD1-seed04= 
|RD1-team04= A González
|RD1-score04-1=2
|RD1-score04-2=1
|RD1-score04-3= 

|RD1-seed05= 
|RD1-team05= S Giraldo
|RD1-score05-1=6
|RD1-score05-2=6
|RD1-score05-3= 
|RD1-seed06=Q
|RD1-team06= R Ramírez Hidalgo
|RD1-score06-1=4
|RD1-score06-2=2
|RD1-score06-3= 

|RD1-seed09=6/WC
|RD1-team09= A Dolgopolov
|RD1-score09-1=64
|RD1-score09-2=6
|RD1-score09-3=5
|RD1-seed10= 
|RD1-team10=
|RD1-score10-1=77
|RD1-score10-2=3
|RD1-score10-3=7

|RD1-seed11= 
|RD1-team11= H Zeballos
|RD1-score11-1=6
|RD1-score11-2=6
|RD1-score11-3= 
|RD1-seed12=WC
|RD1-team12= G Lama
|RD1-score12-1=3
|RD1-score12-2=3
|RD1-score12-3= 

|RD1-seed13= 
|RD1-team13= A Haider-Maurer
|RD1-score13-1=5
|RD1-score13-2=5
|RD1-score13-3= 
|RD1-seed14= 
|RD1-team14= L Mayer
|RD1-score14-1=7
|RD1-score14-2=7
|RD1-score14-3= 

|RD2-seed01=7
|RD2-team01= G García López
|RD2-score01-1=3
|RD2-score01-2=7
|RD2-score01-3=6
|RD2-seed02= 
|RD2-team02= P Lorenzi
|RD2-score02-1=6
|RD2-score02-2=5
|RD2-score02-3=4

|RD2-seed03= 
|RD2-team03= S Giraldo
|RD2-score03-1=79
|RD2-score03-2=77
|RD2-score03-3= 
|RD2-seed04=4
|RD2-team04= M Granollers
|RD2-score04-1=67
|RD2-score04-2=62
|RD2-score04-3= 

|RD2-seed05= 
|RD2-team05=
|RD2-score05-1=6
|RD2-score05-2=6
|RD2-score05-3= 
|RD2-seed06= 
|RD2-team06= H Zeballos
|RD2-score06-1=2
|RD2-score06-2=4
|RD2-score06-3= 

|RD2-seed07= 
|RD2-team07= L Mayer
|RD2-score07-1=3
|RD2-score07-2=710
|RD2-score07-3=6
|RD2-seed08=2
|RD2-team08= T Robredo
|RD2-score08-1=6
|RD2-score08-2=68
|RD2-score08-3=4

|RD3-seed01=7
|RD3-team01= G García López
|RD3-score01-1=6
|RD3-score01-2=4
|RD3-score01-3=2
|RD3-seed02= 
|RD3-team02= S Giraldo
|RD3-score02-1=3
|RD3-score02-2=6
|RD3-score02-3=6

|RD3-seed03= 
|RD3-team03= D Gimeno Traver
|RD3-score03-1=6
|RD3-score03-2=5
|RD3-score03-3=3
|RD3-seed04= 
|RD3-team04= L Mayer
|RD3-score04-1=3
|RD3-score04-2=7
|RD3-score04-3=6

|RD4-seed01= 
|RD4-team01= S Giraldo
|RD4-score01-1=62
|RD4-score01-2= 3
|RD4-score01-3= 
|RD4-seed02= 
|RD4-team02= L Mayer
|RD4-score02-1=77
|RD4-score02-2= 6
|RD4-score02-3= 
}}

Qualifying

Seeds
The top four seeds receive a bye into the second round.

 Guido Pella (qualifying competition)
 Facundo Argüello (qualifying competition) Thomaz Bellucci (qualified) Diego Sebastián Schwartzman (second round)
 João Souza (qualifying competition)
 Pere Riba (second round)
 Facundo Bagnis (qualifying competition) Martín Alund (qualified)'''

Qualifiers

Qualifying draw

First qualifier

Second qualifier

Third qualifier

Fourth qualifier

References 
Main Draw
Qualifying Draw

2014 ATP World Tour
2014 Singles